The Roman Catholic Diocese of Szeged–Csanád is a diocese located in the cities of Szeged and Csanád in the Ecclesiastical province of Kalocsa-Kecskemét in Hungary.

The diocesan cathedral is the Cathedral of Our Lady of the Hungarians in Szeged. The Co-Cathedral of St. Anthony of Padua is based in Békéscsaba.

History
 1035: Established as Diocese of Csanád by King Stephen
 August 5, 1982: Renamed as Diocese of Szeged – Csanád

List of bishops
 1035–1046 St Gerard of Csanád
 1046–1053 Maurus
1053–1083 unknown
 1083–1113 Lorenz
 fl. 1138 Besztréd
 fl. 1142 Pál
 1156–1169 Stefan
 1188–1192 Saul von Altenburg
 1192–1193 Krispin
 1198–1201 János I
 1202–1229 Desiderius
 1229–1254 Bulcsú Lád
 1259–1275 Briccius
 1275–1291 Gergely I
 1298–1307 Antal I
 1307–1332 Benedikt
 1332–1343 Jakab Piancenzai
 1343–1344 István II Harcsáki (Büki)
 1344 Galhard de Carceribus
 1345–1350 Gergely II Kapronczai
 1350–1358 Tamás I Telegdi
 1359–1360 Gergely III Lendvai (Fugyi)
 1360–1373 Domonkos Bebek
 1373–1375 Miklós I
 1377–1379 Pál II Péterfia
 1379–1380 Tamás II
 1380–1386 János II Czudar
 1386–1395 János III
 1395–1397 Lukács I Órévi
 1397–1402 Gergely IV Szeri Pósafi
 1403–1423 Dózsa Marczalli
 1423–1443 László I Marczalli
 1434–1438 Albert I Kerolti
 1438–1457 Péter I Remetei Himfi
 1457–1466 Albert II Hangácsi
 1466–1493 János IV Szokoli
 1493–1500 Lukács II Szegedi Baratin
 1500–1514 Miklós II Körösszegi Csáki
 1514–1526 Ferenc I Csaholi
 1526–1529 János V Musinai Gerván
 1529–1537 János VI Bonzagnó
 1537–1552 János VII Barlabássy
 1553–1554 Ferenc II Medgyesi Székely
 1556–1558 György I Bódy
 1559–1561 Péter II Kapronczay Paulinus
 1561–1562 János VIII Kolozsváry
 1562–1563 András Dudich
 1563–1572 Gergely V Bornemissza
 1572–1582 Boldizsár Persei Melegh
 1582–1587 István III Mathisy
 1587–1597 Pál III Szegedy
 1598–1608 Faustus Verancsics
 1608–1623 Matthias I Herovich
 1623–1625 Emmerich I Lósy
 1625–1637 György II Dubovszky
 1637–1643 János IX Szederkényi Püsky
 1643 György III Pohronczi Szelepcsényi
 1643–1644 György IV Széchenyi
 1644–1648 Zsigmond I Szenttamási Zsongor
 1648–1650 Matthias II Alsőlelóczi Tarnóczy
 1651–1652 István IV Rohonczy
 1653–1657 Tamás III Erdődy Pálffy
 1658–1672 Jácint Macripodari
 1672–1678 Ferdinand Erdődy Pálffy
 1678–1681 János X Kéry
 1681–1685 Miklós III Galánthai Balogh
 1685–1686 György V Fenessy oder Fényessy
 1686–1689 Mihály I Lipótfalvy Dvornikovics
 1689–1699 István V Telekessy
 1699 Ferenc III Jany
 1699–1707 István VI Dolny
 1708- Zsigmond II Ordody
 1710 Ferenc IV Lapsánszky
 1710–1730 László II Nádasdy
 1730–1739 Adalbert von Falkenstein
 1739–1750 Nikola Stanislavič
 1750–1777 Franz Anton Engl Graf von Wagrain
 1777–1798 Emmerich Christovich
 1800–1828 Ladislaus Kőszeghy von Remete
 1829–1832 Anton Török
 1834–1850 József Lonovics
 1848–1849 Mihály Horváth (elected)
 1851–1860 Sándor Csajághy
 1860–1889 Sándor II Bonnaz
 1890–1907 Alexander III Dessewffy Cserneki és Tarkeői 
 1908–1911 János XI Csernoch
 1911–1943 Gyula Móri Glattfelder
 1943–1944 Sándor IV Raskó (Apostolic Administrator)
 1944–1964 Endre II Hamvas
 1964–1969 József II Ijjas (Apostolic Administrator)
 1969–1987 József III Udvardy
 1987–2006 Endre Gyulay
 2006 László Kiss-Rigó

See also
Roman Catholicism in Hungary

Notes

References
 GCatholic.org
 Catholic Hierarchy

External links

 

1035 establishments in Europe
Dioceses established in the 11th century
Roman Catholic dioceses in Hungary
Roman Catholic Ecclesiastical Province of Kalocsa–Kecskemét